De La Salle College (Australia) may refer to:
De La Salle College Ashfield, in Sydney, New South Wales
De La Salle College Caringbah, in Sydney, New South Wales
De La Salle College, Cronulla, in Sydney, New South Wales
De La Salle College, Malvern, in Melbourne, Victoria
De La Salle College, Revesby Heights, in Sydney, New South Wales
De La Salle College, Orange in Orange, NSW, Australia, closed in 1977
LaSalle Catholic College, Bankstown, in Sydney, New South Wales
La Salle College, in Perth, Western Australia
Oakhill College, in Castle Hill, Sydney, New South Wales
O'Connor Catholic College in Armidale, New South Wales, Australia, formerly De La Salle College Armidale
Southern Cross Catholic College in Redcliffe, Queensland, Australia, formerly De La Salle College, Redcliffe

See also
 De La Salle (disambiguation)
 De La Salle Academy (disambiguation)
 De La Salle School (disambiguation)
 La Salle High School (disambiguation)
 La Salle (disambiguation)
 Lasallian educational institutions